June Beatrice Freud, Lady Freud (née Flewett; born 22 June 1927),  is a British actress and theatre director. She is also known by her stage-name Jill Raymond, and was usually known as Jill Freud after her marriage to Clement Freud.

As a war-time teenager, she was evacuated to C.S. Lewis's house in Oxford and she is said to have been the inspiration for Lucy Pevensie in the Chronicles of Narnia.

Stay with Lewis
She and her two sisters were evacuated from London to escape The Blitz. In the summer of 1943, at the age of 16, she moved in with the Lewises at their home The Kilns, in Risinghurst, Oxford, as a housekeeper. Her favourite writer was C.S. Lewis and initially she had no idea she was living in a house with the same man. She developed what she later called a "tremendous crush" on Lewis. She was highly regarded in the household and Lewis in a letter to Flewett's mother, Winifred, on 4 January 1945, said: "I have never really met anything like her unselfishness and patience and kindness and shall feel deeply in her debt as long as I live."

Career
Flewett was an aspiring actress. After two years, she left the Lewises to take up a place at the Royal Academy of Dramatic Art (RADA), her fees being paid by Lewis. Following her graduation, she embarked upon a successful career in the West End under the stage name Jill Raymond. She married Clement Freud in 1950 and performed in occasional radio plays. In the 1970s, when her husband became a Liberal MP for the Isle of Ely, she helped him canvass.

In 1980, she formed her own theatre company, "Jill Freud and Company", in Suffolk. In 2001 she received an Honorary Doctorate in Civil Law from the University of East Anglia "for services to the theatre."

She has five children (one adopted), including Emma Freud and Matthew Freud, and 15 grandchildren. Lady Freud is Vice President of TACT, the Actors' Children's Trust.

References

1927 births
Living people
Alumni of RADA
English Roman Catholics
English stage actresses
English theatre directors
Place of birth missing (living people)
Freud family
People educated at Sacred Heart High School, Hammersmith
Actresses from London
20th-century English actresses
People from Kensington